Strabane Upper (named after Strabane) is a barony  in County Tyrone, Northern Ireland. It is bordered by six other baronies: Tirkeeran and Keenaght to the north; Loughinsholin and Dungannon Upper to the east; Omagh East to the south; and Strabane Lower to the west.

List of settlements
Below is a list of the main settlements in Strabane Upper:

Villages
Brockagh (also known as Mountjoy)
Cranagh
Drumnakilly
Gortin
Greencastle
Knockmoyle
Mountfield
Plumbridge

List of civil parishes
Below is a list of civil parishes in Strabane Upper:
 Bodoney Lower
 Bodoney Upper
 Cappagh (split with barony of Omagh East)
 Termonmaguirk (split with barony of Omagh East)

References